Sajjad Mashayekhi (born February 23, 1994) is an Iranian professional basketball player and gold medal at Asian Cup 2012 Tokyo and 2014 Wuhan and 2016 Tehran He has played for the Iranian national basketball team.

He attended the 2014 World Cup in Spain with the Iranian national basketball team and played in the 2019 World Cup in China with the Iranian national basketball team.

Honors 
National Team
Asian Cup
 Gold medal: 2012
 Gold medal: 2014, 2016
Asian Games
 Silver medal: 2014, 2018
Asian Under-18 Championship
Bronze medal: 2012
William Jones Cup
 Gold medal: 2015,
 Silver medal: 2012
FIBA Asian Cup 
Silver medal 2017
Bronze medal 2015

References 
 تمجید سایت فیبا از ملی پوش بسکتبال ایران www.varzesh3.com (in Persian). 
 مشایخی: امیدوارم پترو در لیگ بسکتبال بماند/ آپشن قراردادها را نگرفته‌ایم www.isna.ir (in Persian).8 July 2020 ایسنا 
 سجاد مشایخی به تیم بسکتبال ذوب اهن پیوست shahraranews.ir  (in Persian).20 Novamber 2020
 سجاد مشایخی گارد رأسی که نمی‌شود دست کم گرفت iribnews.ir (in Persian). 30 September 2020
 مشایخی امتیاز آورترین بازیکن ایران برابر چین تایپه www.yjc.ir (in Persian). 30 August 2015
 سجاد مشایخی برای قهرمانی باید بیشتر تلاش کنیم www.mehrnews.com (in Persian). 21 August 2017
 تیم ملی بسکتبال را تنها نگذارید  khabarvarzeshi.com (in Persian). 19 January 2019
 سجاد مشایخی: هر سه بازی آینده برای بسکتبال فینال است medal1.com (in Persian). 
 سجاد مشایخی |طرفداری  www.tarafdari.com (in Persian).
 Sajjad Mashayekhi is one of the best defenders in Asian basketball from the point of view of the FIBA author. Iribnews.ir (in Persian). 23 July 2017
 Sajjad Mashayekhi at profile fiba
 Sajjad Mashayekhi at fiba world cup
 Sajjad Mashayekhi websites.sportstg.com
 Sajjad Mashayekhi www.proballers.com
 Sajjad Mashayekhi at www.Olympic.org
Sajjad Mashayekhi at Asia basket profile 
Iran men's basketball national team Wikipedia

External links 
 Asia-Basket profile Fiba
 Fiba_Basket profile Asia
Sajjad Mashayekhi at Islamic Republic of Iran Basketball Federation) (IRIBF)
 Sajjad Mashayekhi on Instagram 
 Sajjad Mashayekhi at the Olympic

Iranian men's basketball players
1994 births
Living people
Basketball players at the 2010 Summer Youth Olympics
Point guards
Sportspeople from Tehran
Asian Games silver medalists for Iran
Asian Games medalists in basketball
Basketball players at the 2014 Asian Games
Basketball players at the 2018 Asian Games
Medalists at the 2014 Asian Games
Medalists at the 2018 Asian Games
2014 FIBA Basketball World Cup players
2019 FIBA Basketball World Cup players